Leanid Paulavich Harai (13 January 1937 – 5 August 2019) was a Soviet footballer and manager.

Playing career
Harai's father was killed in World War II when he was age 4. After the war, Harai began playing football at school in Brest and then Minsk. He would join FC Spartak Minsk's senior side where he began playing in the second-tier Soviet Class B league. In 1960, Harai joined FC Urozhay Minsk. The following season he joined FC Belarus Minsk, a club composed of several former Spartak and Urozhay players, which competed in the 1961 Soviet Top League. Harai finished his playing career with spells at FC SKA Minsk and FC Spartak Brest.

Coaching career
After he retired from playing, Harai embarked on a managerial career. He led FC Spartak Brest to its highest-ever level in Soviet football, reaching the 1969 Soviet Class A Second Group.

References

External links
Profile at footballfacts.ru

1937 births
2019 deaths
Soviet footballers
Soviet football managers
Soviet Top League players
FC Dinamo Minsk players
FC Dynamo Brest players
FC Dynamo Brest managers
Association football defenders